WB, Wb, or wb may refer to:

Businesses and organizations
 Warner Bros., a large American film and television company
 The WB, an American television network from 1995 to 2006
 WB Channel, an Indian channel from Warner Bros
 RwandAir, a Rwandan airline whose International Air Transport Association code is "WB"
 Wachovia, an American banking chain whose former New York Stock Exchange IP was "WB"
 W.B. Mason, an American office supply company
 World Balance, a Filipino shoe company
 World Bank Group, an international finance organization
 World Bowling, the international governing body for nine-pin and ten-pin bowling
 Whataburger, a speed-food restaurant chain in the southern United States from Florida to Arizona
 WildBlue, an American satellite internet service provider
 Waagner-Biro, an Austrian company
 Wild Bunch (company), a film financer from France
 The World Bank, an international financial institution that provides loans and grants to governments of low- and middle-income countries

Places
 West Bengal, a state in eastern India, whose ISO abbreviation is "IN-WB"
 West Bank of the river Jordan, a disputed region in the Middle East
 West Brighton, a neighborhood on the North Shore of Staten Island, colloquially termed "the WB" or "the West"

Science
 Weber (unit) (Wb), the SI unit of magnetic flux
 Western blot, a medical diagnosis tool
 White balance, a technical term in color photography
 Woronin body, a microbody in the hyphae of filamentous Ascomycota
 Wörterbuch der ägyptischen Sprache, the standard dictionary of Ancient Egyptian, published 1926–1963, in bibliographies
 Writeback, a procedure conducted by a computer cache
 Wet bulb, a temperature definition

Sport
 Waasland-Beveren, Belgian football club
 Warmbloods, a group of middle-weight horse types and breeds, primarily originating in Europe
 Western Bulldogs, an Australian rules football club
 Wing-back (association football), a position in association football

Other
 Wikibooks, a Wikimedia project